Stictonaclia myodes is a moth of the subfamily Arctiinae. It was described by Félix Édouard Guérin-Méneville in 1832. It is found on Madagascar.

References

 

Arctiinae
Moths described in 1832